is a public park located in Takatsuki, Osaka.

Parks and gardens in Osaka Prefecture